Mohamed Azmin bin Ali (Jawi: محمد عزمين بن علي; born 25 August 1964) is a Malaysian politician who served as Senior Minister of the Economic Cluster and as Minister of International Trade and Industry from 2020 to 2022. A member of Parti Pribumi Bersatu Malaysia (BERSATU), which is the component party of Perikatan Nasional (PN) coalition, he served as the Member of Parliament (MP) for Gombak from 2008 to 2022 and Member of the Selangor State Legislative Assembly (MLA) for Bukit Antarabangsa since March 2008.

Born in Singapore, Azmin was raised in Kuala Lumpur. He studied at the University of Minnesota before earning a degree in economics and mathematics, and later continued his master's degree. During his study, he was actively involved in student politics.

Azmin started working for Anwar Ibrahim, who was a cabinet minister under Prime Minister Mahathir Mohamad at the time, in 1987 after returning to Malaysia. After Anwar was made deputy prime minister, Azmin was hired by him to be his personal secretary. In 1998, Anwar was dismissed from the government; however, Azmin stayed loyal and close to him. They both protested the decision and went on to establish Parti Keadilan Rakyat (PKR), a new political party that they both served as founders of.

Azmin's political career began after he won the Hulu Kelang state assembly seat in the 1999 election. He was unable to defend the seat in the 2004 election after being barred for allegedly lying in court during the trial against Anwar. Azmin returned to politics in the 2008 election after winning the Gombak parliamentary seat and the Bukit Antarabangsa state assembly seat. In 2010, he became the deputy president of PKR. He managed to win both seats in the 2013 and 2018 elections. He lost the Gombak seat in the 2022 election. 

Azmin served his first term in the Perikatan Nasional (PN) administration under former Prime Minister Muhyiddin Yassin from March 2020 to August 2021. He also served as Senior Minister in charge of Economy in the PN administration under Muhyiddin from March 2020 to August 2021, Minister of Economic Affairs in the Pakatan Harapan (PH) administration under former Prime Minister Mahathir Mohamad from May 2018 to the collapse of the PH administration in February 2020 and Menteri Besar of Selangor from September 2014 to June 2018. He is a member of the Supreme Council and Chairman of the International Bureau of the Malaysian United Indigenous Party (BERSATU), a component party of the ruling PN coalition. He is a founding member, was a member and served as Deputy President of the People's Justice Party (PKR), a component party of the PH opposition coalition, from November 2010 to his resignation from party in February 2020 with several other MPs and its Vice-President from November 2001 to his promotion to Deputy President in November 2010. He is also former President of the Football Association of Selangor (FAS).

Early years and education
Mohamed Azmin Ali was born on 25 August 1964 in Singapore (then a state of Malaysia) to Ali and Che Tom Yahaya. His father worked for the British Army as a clerk. Shortly after the separation, his family later moved to Kuala Lumpur. He began his education at Gurney Road Primary School, then Setapak High School, and ended it at Jalan Cheras Technical Institute.

He received Bachelor of Science (BSc) in Economics and Mathematics from the University of Minnesota. He later completed his Master of Education's degree (MEd) from the same institute where he met Shamsidar Taharin, his future wife. While studying, Azmin taught modern and additional mathematics. One of his notable students was Razali Ibrahim, a former deputy minister, when they were in MRSM Terendak. He also attended an executive training programme at the University of Oxford.

Political career

Early career
In 1987, following advice from the Prime Minister Mahathir Mohamad, Azmin started working for Anwar Ibrahim, who was then a Minister in Mahathir's Barisan Nasional government. Azmin served as Anwar's personal secretary through Anwar's appointment as Deputy Prime Minister in 1993 and until Mahathir sacked Anwar in 1998.  Azmin remained close to Anwar following the dismissal and they both became founders of the opposition Parti Keadilan Nasional (KeADILan), which later became the People's Justice Party or Parti Keadilan Rakyat (PKR).

State assemblyman and parliamentarian
Keadilan entered the 1999 general elections amidst voter anger over Anwar's dismissal and subsequent imprisonment. Azmin was elected Selangor State Assemblyman for Hulu Kelang. However, he was barred from participating in the 2004 general elections due to his conviction for lying in court during the trial against Anwar. The High Court and Court of Appeal have since acquitted him.

Azmin returned to national politics in the 2008 general elections, winning the Gombak parliamentary seat and Bukit Antarabangsa state seat in Selangor. Meanwhile, in 2010, he won an internal PKR election for the party's deputy presidency. He replaced Syed Husin, who did not seek re-election. He was reelected as the party's deputy president in 2018 after a close election against Rafizi Ramli.

In the 2013 general elections and 2018 general elections he managed to clinch both seats again.

Menteri Besar of Selangor

Azmin became the Menteri Besar of Selangor on 23 September 2014, following the resignation of the PKR incumbent Khalid Ibrahim. His ascension to the post followed months of internal political wrangling within the Pakatan Rakyat coalition that led the state. Khalid had been the Menteri Besar since the coalition of PKR, the Democratic Action Party (DAP) and the Pan-Malaysian Islamic Party (PAS) won a majority in the Selangor State Assembly in the 2008 election. In early 2014, PKR's national leader, Anwar Ibrahim, then a federal parliamentarian sought to contest the Selangor State Assembly seat of Kajang in a by-election. The so-called "Kajang Move" would have allowed Anwar to oust Khalid as Menteri Besar with PKR's support. However, after Anwar's conviction for sodomy weeks before the by-election, his wife Wan Azizah Wan Ismail assumed PKR's nomination for the by-election in his place and won the seat. Khalid resigned as Menteri Besar after PKR withdrew its support for his leadership later in the year. PKR, with the DAP's support, nominated Wan Azizah to replace him, but both the Sultan of Selangor (who appoints the Menteri Besar) and the third coalition party, PAS, sought other options. The Sultan requested that each coalition party submit three names for his consideration. PKR and the DAP submitted only Wan Azizah's name, while PAS submitted others. On 22 September, the Sultan announced the appointment of Azmin. He was sworn into office the following morning.

Azmin was the sole recipient of the Order of the Crown of Selangor in Knight Grand Commander class (S.P.M.S) in 2015, which carries the title 'Dato' Seri' in conjunction with the 70th birthday of the Sultan of Selangor Sultan Sharafuddin Idris Shah on 11 December 2015.

Azmin was once again reelected as the Menteri Besar of Selangor in the aftermath of 2018 Malaysian general election after defending his Bukit Antarabangsa state seat. He was sworn into title on the evening of 11 May 2018 at Istana Alam Shah.

Minister of Economic Affairs
Following the aftermath of the 2018 General Election, Azmin was named as one of the ministers in the newly elected Prime Minister Mahathir Mohamad's cabinet on 18 May 2018. He is to head the newly established Ministry of Economic Affairs. He was sworn in as the Minister of Economic Affairs on 21 May 2018 at Istana Negara. His term ended on 24 February 2020 after the dissolution of cabinet following the resignation of Mahathir Mohamad as Malaysia's Prime Minister per article 43(5) of the Constitution of Malaysia, that allowed the Yang di-Pertuan Agong to revoke the appointment of ministers.

Change of allegiance

On the morning of 23 February 2020, Azmin held a meeting with several lawmakers from Parti Keadilan Rakyat (PKR) and twenty others at Sheraton Hotel, Petaling, amidst the rumour of a formation of a new coalition at the parliament of Malaysia. He and his faction in PKR, went to the Istana Negara on the evening to seek a meeting with the Yang di-Pertuan Agong, Abdullah of Pahang. Leaders from other five political parties; Bersatu's Muhyiddin Yassin, UMNO's Ahmad Zahid Hamidi, GPS's Abang Johari Openg, Warisan's Shafie Apdal and PAS's Hadi Awang were also in attendance. It was speculated that the leaders were there to brief the Agong about the recent political development; formation of a new coalition government and to declare their support for a new prime minister, effectively blocking PKR's president Anwar Ibrahim from the position. After the meeting, several opposition party leaders, including UMNO's Ismail Sabri Yaakob and PAS' Hadi Awang then joined Azmin's supporters at Sheraton Hotel.

On the next day, 24 February, PKR's general secretary, Saifuddin Nasution Ismail announced in a press conference at the party's headquarters that Azmin and Minister of Housing and Local Government, Zuraida Kamaruddin who is also the vice president of PKR had been sacked from the party. Saifuddin explained that they were expelled due to their actions on 23 October which was against the party's principle regarding the position of prime minister. Azmin later announced that he will be forming an independent bloc at the parliament along with Zuraida and other nine MPs who had decided to exit the party following his expulsion. However, on 28 February 2020, a representative from Bersatu confirmed that Azmin and his faction had joined the party. Azmin said, 'immoral sexual practices' by Anwar caused him to lose faith in the PKR president. Azmin said he doubted the full pardon status granted by the Yang di-Pertuan Agong against Anwar. He added that he was still committed to fighting and eliminating corruption even though he had joined Bersatu. He also denied that he was responsible for the Pakatan Harapan (PH) government's fall in February last year.

He was named as one of the four senior ministers alongside Ismail Sabri Yaakob, Fadillah Yusof and Mohd Radzi Md Jidin in Muhyiddin cabinet on 9 March 2020. The positions were established by Muhyiddin Yassin, the eighth prime minister as a substitute for the deputy prime minister position. Although the four ministers were of equal standings, Azmin was designated by the prime minister to preside over the cabinet's meeting in his absence.

Controversies and issues

Alleged leaked sex tape
On 12 June 2019, it was reported that Azmin was filmed being intimate with another man, political aide Haziq Abdul Aziz, in a video circulating on social media. Azmin has denied his involvement. Muhammad Haziq Abdul Aziz later confirmed his involvement in the act with the minister and urged authorities to investigate him. Until 16 July 2019, nine people had been arrested by Royal Malaysia Police in the investigation regarding their involvement in making and distribution of the lewd video, including Haziq who had admitted he was the person in the video, and Farhash Wafa Salvador Rizal Mubarak who is PKR Perak state chairman and is also Anwar Ibrahim's political secretary. On 18 July 2019, the Inspector General of Police, Abdul Hamid Bador stated that although the video was authentic, the individual in the video is unidentifiable. He also stated that the group of individuals who made the video were paid thousand of Ringgits, and the video circulation was masterminded by a leader of a political party, with the intention to degrade and defame someone's reputation.

Instigation of Sheraton Move

Following the Political Infighting within Pakatan Harapan and Perikatan Nasional Government. Bersatu President Muhyiddin Yassin together with PAS President Abdul Hadi Awang and PKR's defected members led by Azmin Ali formed the Perikatan Nasional and worked alongside UMNO leader Ismail Sabri Yaakob to fill the power vacuum after the resignation of then-Prime Minister Mahathir Mohamad. The alliance produced a simple majority in the Malaysian Government, resulting in political instability that led to the Malaysian political crisis.

Voters file suit against Azmin 
Ten registered voters in the Gombak parliamentary constituency have filed a suit against their parliament member, Mohamed Azmin Ali. The plaintiffs claim that Mohamed Azmin's representations were false and that he only wanted their votes. The ten also claimed that they had relied on those representations to vote for the defendant's 2018 General Election. They seek damages, including aggravated or exemplary damages, interests, costs and other orders deemed fit by the court. "By breaching these representations, the defendant had violated constitutional rights, especially the principles of parliamentary democracy and representative democracy," they said in a statement of claim. The plaintiffs are applying for a declaration that the defendant has breached his fiduciary duties and the duties owed and deceived them.

Personal life
Azmin is married to Shamshida Tahrin, a finance graduate also from the University of Minnesota. The couple have three sons and three daughters. He lives in Ampang.

In addition to an elder brother, Azman Ali, among his younger brothers are television host and celebrity Azwan Ali, and motivator Arpah Ali, while his younger sister is Ummi Hafilda Ali, a prosecution witness in the sodomy trial of jailed former deputy prime minister Anwar Ibrahim.

Election results

Honours

Honours of Malaysia 
  :
  Knight Grand Commander of the Order of the Crown of Selangor (SPMS) – Dato' Seri (2015)
  :
  Knight Grand Companion of the Order of Loyalty to the Royal House of Kedah (SSDK) – Dato' Seri (2022)

References

External links

 Personal biography
 Official blog

|-

|-

|-

|-

|-

|-

|-

|-

Living people
1964 births
People from Singapore
Kuala Lumpur politicians
Singaporean emigrants to Malaysia
People who lost Singaporean citizenship
Citizens of Malaysia through descent
Malaysian people of Malay descent
Malaysian Muslims
Chief Ministers of Selangor
Members of the Dewan Rakyat
Members of the Selangor State Legislative Assembly
Selangor state executive councillors
Government ministers of Malaysia
Economy ministers of Malaysia
Former People's Justice Party (Malaysia) politicians
Former United Malays National Organisation politicians
Malaysian United Indigenous Party politicians
University of Minnesota College of Liberal Arts alumni
University of Minnesota College of Education and Human Development alumni
Knights Grand Commander of the Order of the Crown of Selangor